Phocosaurus is an extinct genus of tapinocephalian therapsid.

See also

 List of synapsids

References
 The main groups of non-mammalian synapsids at Mikko's Phylogeny Archive

Dinocephalians
Synapsids